Jean-Paul Hanquier (born May 12, 1953) is a French sprint canoer.

Career
Hanquier competed in the late 1970s. He won a silver medal in the K-2 10000 m event at the 1978 ICF Canoe Sprint World Championships in Belgrade.

Hanquier also competed at the 1976 Summer Olympics in Montreal, finishing fourth in the K-2 1000 m event.

References

Sports-reference.com profile

1953 births
Canoeists at the 1976 Summer Olympics
French male canoeists
Living people
Olympic canoeists of France
ICF Canoe Sprint World Championships medalists in kayak